Mihai Flamaropol Skating Rink was an arena in Bucharest, Romania.  It was primarily used for ice hockey, being the home of the club Steaua Rangers and holding 8,000 people.

Mihai Flamaropol was a former ice hockey and football player. 

The Skating Rink was demolished in March 2016 to make way for a 16,000-seat multi-purpose arena.

Events
 2012 Edvin Marton, Evgeni Plushenko, Brian Joubert & Stéphane Lambiel in "Kings On Ice"
 2013 Edvin Marton, Evgeni Plushenko & many others in "Kings On Ice 3"

References

Indoor ice hockey venues in Romania
Music venues in Romania
Concert halls in Romania